The 1975–76 FIBA Korać Cup was the fifth edition of FIBA's new competition, running from 28 October 1975 to 23 March 1976. It was contested by 30 teams, twelve less than in the previous edition.

Jugoplastika defeated Chinamartini Torino in the final to become the competition's champion for first time.

Season teams

First round

|}

Second round

|}

Automatically qualified to round of 16
 FC Barcelona
 Partizan
 Brina Rieti
 Olympique Antibes

Round of 16
The round of 16 were played with a round-robin system, in which every Two Game series (TGS) constituted as one game for the record.

Semi finals

|}

Finals

|}

References
Linguasport 1975–76 FIBA Korać Cup
1975–76 FIBA Korać Cup

1975–76
1975–76 in European basketball